SFCO is a four-letter abbreviation that may refer to any of the following:

San Francisco Chamber Orchestra
Santa Fe Community Orchestra
Société française pour le commerce avec l'Outre-mer, a French trading house
Sucsy, Fischer & Company (SFCo), a Chicago area-based independent investment banking firm